Government Medical College and Hospital, Nandurbar is a full-fledged tertiary referral Government Medical college in Nandurbar, Maharashtra. It was established in year 2020. The college imparts the degree Bachelor of Medicine and Surgery (MBBS). The college is affiliated to Maharashtra University of Health Sciences and is recognized by the National Medical Commission. The hospital associated with the college is one of the largest hospitals in the Nandurbar. The selection to the college is done on the basis of merit and reservation through National Eligibility and Entrance Test.

Courses
Government Medical College and Hospital, Nandurbar undertakes education and training of students MBBS courses.

See also
List of hospitals in India

References

External links 
Official website

Medical colleges in Maharashtra
Universities and colleges in Maharashtra
Educational institutions established in 2020
2020 establishments in Maharashtra
Affiliates of Maharashtra University of Health Sciences